Heitzmann is a surname. Notable people with the surname include:

Carl Heitzmann (1836–1896), Austrian pathologist and dermatologist
Sébastien Heitzmann (born 1979), French footballer